Germantown is an unincorporated community in Worcester County, Maryland, United States.

References

Unincorporated communities in Maryland
Unincorporated communities in Worcester County, Maryland